Alegaon Paga  is a panchayat village in the state of Maharashtra, India. The village is 2.6 kilometres east of the Bhima River.  Administratively, Alegaon Paga is under Shirur Taluka of Pune District in Maharashtra.  The village of Alegaon Paga is 5.5 km by road north of the village of Ranjangaon Sandas, and 31 km by road south of the town of Shirur.

There are two villages in the Alegaon Paga gram panchayat: Alegaon Paga and Arangaon.

Demographics
In the 2001 census, the village of Alegaon Paga had 2,610 inhabitants, with 1,347 males (51.6%) and 1,263 females (48.4%), for a gender ratio of 938 females per thousand males.

See also

 Shirur Taluka

Notes and references

External links
 
 

Villages in Pune district